Seffner is a census-designated place (CDP) in Hillsborough County, Florida, United States. The population at the 2020 census was 8,362, up from 7,579 at the 2010 census. 

Though still characterized by towering live oak trees, strawberry farms and lakes, Seffner has been growing rapidly in recent years, with housing subdivisions being added to the once rural landscape.

History
Some historians claim that Seffner's streets were originally laid out in 1862, but not recorded as a plat formally until 1885. Seffner's post office opened in 1884 when a new railroad line in the area had been planned. The community was named for its first postmaster, F.P. Seffner. That same year, Seffner's first school and store were opened. Seffner quickly became a prosperous small community with citrus groves, a hotel, one drug store, several dry goods stores and a livery stable. When an epidemic of yellow fever hit Tampa in the fall of 1887 and in 1888, many Tampa refugees fled to Seffner for temporary shelter in the hotel. However, as refugees and mail arrived in Seffner, they were fumigated as protection from the epidemic. Among the refugees was T.C. Taliaferro of the First National Bank of Tampa, who operated a branch banking business from Seffner during the epidemic.

The main thoroughfare leading north and south was Lenna Avenue, and leading east and west was Highway Number 23, renamed Buffalo Avenue, because of its erstwhile use as a buffalo trail, and then renamed again in 1989 to its current name, Dr. Martin Luther King, Jr. Boulevard (Hwy 574). Seffner (and neighboring Mango and Dover) served as the three primary towns along the South Florida Railroad right-of-way between Tampa and Plant City. These towns owe their existence and prosperity to the railroad, each becoming an important shipping center.

The freeze in the winter of 1894–1895 brought disaster to Seffner. Many citizens left, while others remained to recoup their losses. Seffner survived and regained its affluence. Attractive residential neighborhoods were built to accommodate the influx of desirable residents. By 1925, Seffner was the fourth-largest town in Hillsborough County.

Geography
Seffner is located northeast of the center of Hillsborough County and is bordered by Thonotosassa to the north, Mango to the west, and Brandon to the south. Interstate 4 is the northern boundary of the CDP, and the southern boundary follows State Road 574 (Dr. Martin Luther King Jr. Boulevard).

Demographics

As of the census of 2000, there were 5,467 people, 2,075 households, and 1,520 families residing in the community. The racial makeup of the community was 91.35% White, 3.26% African American, 0.29% Native American, 1.02% Asian, 2.71% from other races, and 1.37% from two or more races. Hispanic or Latino of any race were 8.21% of the population.

There were 2,075 households, out of which 34.9% had children under the age of 18 living with them, 56.1% were married couples living together, 11.7% had a female householder with no husband present, and 26.7% were non-families. 21.5% of all households were made up of individuals, and 8.9% had someone living alone who was 65 years of age or older. The average household size was 2.63 and the average family size was 3.04.

In the community the population was spread out, with 26.4% under the age of 18, 7.7% from 18 to 24, 29.9% from 25 to 44, 24.4% from 45 to 64, and 11.6% who were 65 years of age or older. The median age was 37 years. For every 100 females, there were 95.4 males. For every 100 females age 18 and over, there were 90.0 males.

The median income for a household in the community was $42,614, and the median income for a family was $49,152. Males had a median income of $32,266 versus $26,328 for females. The per capita income for the community was $19,888. About 3.2% of families and 4.6% of the population were below the poverty line, including 4.0% of those under age 18 and 7.5% of those age 65 or over.

Arts and culture

Public library
The Seffner-Mango Branch Library is located in Seffner.

Parks and recreation 
There are six public parks in Seffner: Seffner-Mango Park, Evans Recreation Center, E.L. Bing Park, Higginbotham Park, Mango Dog Park, and Lakewood Park.

Lake Weeks is a lake located on the southeast side of Seffner. It has a surface area of 57.73 acres and is known for its fishing and Spanish moss.

Three recreation centers are located in Seffner. The Evans Recreation Center offers special programs for children ages 6–17 and it features a basketball court, playground equipment, a hockey court, a softball field, a football field, and a soccer field. The Mango Recreation Center has a large park with two basketball courts, two softball fields, a playground, and a 5-acre dog park. The Seffner Civic Center is a historical land site with a basketball court, picnic tables, a playground, and a large open field.

The Rodney Colson Sports Complex is a park with an open field, biking trail, and walking trail.

Wildlife conservation
The Life Fellowship Bird Sanctuary located in Seffner, affiliated with a local church. Birds and reptiles are kept there, and the facility is noted for its success in breeding rock iguanas in captivity.

Education

Public schools
Hillsborough County Public Schools serves Seffner.

Elementary schools
Colson Elementary
Lopez Elementary
McDonald Elementary
Seffner Elementary

Middle schools
Gordon Burnett Middle School
Jennings Middle School

High schools
Armwood High School

Private schools
Hillsborough Baptist
Impact Academy
Legacy Christian Academy
Livingstone Academy
Seffner Christian Academy

Notable people
Matt Joyce, professional baseball outfielder, raised in Seffner
Andrew W.K., musician, lived in Seffner in 1999

See also
Mango-Seffner, Florida, a single census area recorded during the 1980 census

References

External links
 Greater Seffner Area Chamber of Commerce

Census-designated places in Hillsborough County, Florida
Census-designated places in Florida
1884 establishments in Florida